Akio Saito (斉藤 明雄, born February 23, 1955) is a former Nippon Professional Baseball pitcher.

External links

1955 births
Living people
Baseball people from Kyoto Prefecture
Japanese baseball players
Nippon Professional Baseball pitchers
Taiyō Whales players
Yokohama Taiyō Whales players
Yokohama BayStars players
Nippon Professional Baseball Rookie of the Year Award winners
Japanese baseball coaches
Nippon Professional Baseball coaches